Antanetibe Anativolo is a rural commune in Analamanga Region, in the Central Highlands of Madagascar. It belongs to the district of Anjozorobe and its populations numbers to 20,257  in 2018.

To the commune belong 11 fokontany (villages).

Economy
The economy is based on agriculture.  Rice, corn, peanuts, beans, manioc, soja and oignons are the main crops.

References

External links

Populated places in Analamanga